Rami Al Hajj (born 17 September 2001) is a Swedish professional footballer who plays as an attacking midfielder for Dutch club Heerenveen. Born in Lebanon, Al Hajj moved to Sweden and represented them internationally at youth level.

Club career
A youth product of Falkenbergs FF, Al Hajj moved to Heerenveen in 2018. He made his professional debut with Heerenveen in a 3–1 Eredivisie loss to Feyenoord, on 18 January 2020.

International career
Al Hajj was born in Beirut, Lebanon, and moved to Sweden at the age of two. He is a youth international for Sweden.

Personal life
Born in Lebanon, Al Hajj had his surname changed to "Hajal" when he moved to Sweden. On 15 September 2021, he changed his surname back to Al Hajj.

References

External links
 
 
 Rami Al Hajj at Eredivisie

2001 births
Living people
Footballers from Beirut
Swedish footballers
Lebanese footballers
Lebanese emigrants to Sweden
Sportspeople of Lebanese descent
Association football midfielders
SC Heerenveen players
Eredivisie players
Sweden youth international footballers
Swedish expatriate footballers
Swedish expatriate sportspeople in the Netherlands
Lebanese expatriate footballers
Lebanese expatriate sportspeople in the Netherlands
Expatriate footballers in the Netherlands